Fleury-devant-Douaumont (literally Fleury before Douaumont) is a commune in the Meuse department in Grand Est in north-eastern France.

During the Battle of Verdun in 1916 it was captured and recaptured by the Germans and French 16 times. Since then, it has been unoccupied (official population: 0), as have the communes of Bezonvaux, Beaumont-en-Verdunois, Haumont-près-Samogneux, Louvemont-Côte-du-Poivre and Cumières-le-Mort-Homme.

History
During the war, the town was completely destroyed and the land rendered so uninhabitable that officials decided not to rebuild it. As the land around the municipality was polluted with corpses, ammunition, explosives and poisonous gas, it was deemed too contaminated for farming to resume. The site is maintained as a testimony to war and is officially designated as a "village that died for France." It is managed by a municipal council of three members appointed by the prefect of the Meuse department.

Before the war Fleury was a village of 422 engaged in agriculture and woodworking. Today, it is a wooded area next to the Verdun Memorial. Arrows guide visitors to where the streets and houses used to be.

See also
 Zone rouge (First World War)
 List of French villages destroyed in World War I
 Communes of the Meuse department

References

Communes of Meuse (department)
Battle of Verdun
Former populated places in France